Better Oblivion Community Center is an American indie rock superduo consisting of musicians Conor Oberst and Phoebe Bridgers. They released their self-titled debut album on January 24, 2019, through Dead Oceans.

Background
Oberst and Bridgers first met in July 2016, when she performed at a secret showcase he was hosting at the Bootleg Theater in Los Angeles. A mutual friend of theirs was helping organize the event and told Oberst that Bridgers was his favorite songwriter in LA at the time, so he invited her to play and was so impressed that he immediately asked her to send him the record she was working on. She then opened for him on his European Ruminations tour in January 2017, and they continued to collaborate consistently over the following two years. He brought her onstage to sing the Bright Eyes song "Lua" at WXPN's Xponential Music Festival that July, he sang on the duet "Would You Rather" from her debut Stranger in the Alps in September, they covered Sheryl Crow with Soccer Mommy at the Music Hall of Williamsburg in February 2018, and they worked together on a new version of his song "LAX" for Amazon Music in October, among numerous other joint appearances at each other's shows across the U.S.

The initial idea of forming the band apparently stemmed from Bridgers complimenting a cover Oberst had done of a Replacements song one night, and him replying that they should start a band and sound like the Replacements. When they first started writing together, they hadn't planned on putting out a record, and they thought they might be writing for one of each other's solo efforts or for a third party. Bridgers has said that it's common for Oberst to dream up "fake bands", so she didn't know that he was being serious until they had written "like, five songs". They mentioned that they wanted to create a separate project with its own name so that they could feel free to create a sound different than their individual solo acts.

Career

The duo released Better Oblivion Community Center on January 24, 2019, through Dead Oceans to generally positive reviews. The album was teased with "cryptic brochures" and a phone hotline, but was released with only a day of official notice and featured no promotional singles beforehand, which Bridgers explains was an effort to avoid people "[making] assumptions about what the entire record sounds like", since the songs are each so different.

They also filmed a segment at the NPR Tiny Desk.

On January 29, 2019, the band announced their expansive concert tour of the U.S. and Europe, along with releasing a music video for their single, "Dylan Thomas," directed by Michelle Zauner.

Toward the end of their U.S. tour in April 2019, they released the single "Little Trouble," a song not featured on the album that had previously only been available as a 7-inch vinyl they'd been selling at their shows.

Discography

Studio albums

Singles

Accolades

References

2019 establishments in California
Musical groups established in 2019
Rock music supergroups
American musical duos
Musical groups from Los Angeles
Indie rock musical groups from California
Conor Oberst
Dead Oceans artists